Moe 'Montgomery' Hart Herscovitch (27 October 1897 – 22 July 1969) was a Canadian middleweight and welterweight boxer who competed in the early 1920s.  He was also a prominent rugby football player in Montreal.

Early life
Born in either Romania or Canada (sources differ) to Jewish parents, Vetra 'William' and Anna Herscovitch, he emigrated with his family to Montréal, Canada.  He anglicised his given name to 'Montgomery,' but was known to everyone as 'Moe.'

Although short in stature at 5' 6", he was incredibly athletic.  He played football with the Montreal Football Club of the Inter-Provincial Rugby Union until 1915 when it was disbanded due to the increasing hostilities of World War I.

Service in WWI
Eager to do his part in WWI, Herscovitch joined the 66th Battery, Canadian Expeditionary Forces.  A gunner, while posted overseas he took up the sport of boxing, winning a number of competitions, including the Aldershot welterweight division. When he returned from the War in 1919, he played with Montreal's successor rugby team which won the division championships that year, but he also continued to box.

He was selected for Canada's 1920 Olympic boxing team and assigned to its middleweight division.  At Antwerp that August, he won a bronze medal, only losing to Briton Harry Mallin in the semi-final.

He married Celia Goldblatt at Temple Beth Jhuda in Montreal on 18 December 1921.

1920 Summer Olympics
Herscovitch competed in the 1920 Summer Olympics in Antwerp, Belgium, where he won the bronze medal in the men's middleweight event.

Professional boxing career
Herscovitch turned professional early the next year, and defeated Olympic gold medallist Bert Schneider on 18 May 1921.  He spent the next few years fighting in Canada and New York City, putting together an inconsistent record.  He beat Art Prud'homme in 8 November 1922 in a seventh-round knockout.   He suffered losses as well, including his fight against world titleholder Mickey Walker on December 21, 1923 in Toronto, in which Herscovitch was billed as the Canadian welterweight champion.  Walker won with a sixth round knockout, having broken his opponent's right hand during the fight.

Life after boxing
Herscovitch retired in the summer of 1924, and began volunteering as a boxing coach at the Montreal YMHA.

Although he boxed at a time when fighters wore no protective gear, 'Moe' had never suffered a debilitating injury in the ring.  However, on 24 July 1943 while on holiday at the summer resort of Plage Laval, he and some companions were set upon by a French Canadian anti-Semitic mob and beaten so badly that surgeons were forced to remove one of his eyes.

He continued to be actively involved in sports and his community, and served as president of the Quebec Rugby Union.

He died on 22 July 1969, and was buried at the Baron de Hirsch Cemetery in Montreal.

References

External links 
 
 Moe Herscovitch's profile at Sports Reference.com
 1967 'Canadian Jewish Chronicle' article reviewing career of Moe Herscovitch
 Newsreel film of Moe Herscovitch in the ring at the 1920 Summer Olympics

1897 births
Place of birth missing
1969 deaths
Jewish boxers
Jewish Canadian sportspeople
Middleweight boxers
Olympic boxers of Canada
Boxers at the 1920 Summer Olympics
Olympic bronze medalists for Canada
Olympic medalists in boxing
Boxers from Montreal
Medalists at the 1920 Summer Olympics
Canadian male boxers
Romanian emigrants to Canada
Canadian people of Romanian-Jewish descent
Players of Canadian football from Quebec